Parurios is a genus of wasps belonging to the family Pteromalidae.

The species of this genus are found in Central America.

Species:

Parurios argenticoxae 
Parurios atriscutum 
Parurios australiana 
Parurios conoidea 
Parurios fusca 
Parurios keatsi 
Parurios keralensis 
Parurios poei 
Parurios truncatipennis

References

Pteromalidae
Hymenoptera genera